Osceola Mills is a borough in Clearfield County, Pennsylvania, United States. The population was 1,045 at the 2020 census.

Geography
Osceola Mills is located along the southeastern border of Clearfield County at  (40.852870, -78.270455). It is on the north side of Moshannon Creek, which forms the boundary between Clearfield and Centre counties.

Pennsylvania Route 53 passes through Osceola Mills, leading northeast  to Philipsburg and southwest  to Houtzdale. Pennsylvania Route 970 crosses PA 53 in the center of town and leads northwest  to Clearfield, the county seat, and southeast  to Sandy Ridge.

Demographics

As of the census of 2000, there were 1,249 people, 522 households, and 342 families residing in the borough. The population density was 3,717.8 people per square mile (1,418.4/km2). There were 581 housing units at an average density of 1,729.4 per square mile (659.8/km2). The racial makeup of the borough was 99.44% White, 0.16% Native American, 0.16% Asian, and 0.24% from two or more races. Hispanic or Latino of any race were 0.72% of the population.

There were 522 households, out of which 27.8% had children under the age of 18 living with them, 51.9% were married couples living together, 10.0% had a female householder with no husband present, and 34.3% were non-families. 30.1% of all households were made up of individuals, and 15.7% had someone living alone who was 65 years of age or older. The average household size was 2.37 and the average family size was 2.93.

In the borough the population was spread out, with 22.5% under the age of 18, 7.6% from 18 to 24, 29.5% from 25 to 44, 22.0% from 45 to 64, and 18.3% who were 65 years of age or older. The median age was 38 years. For every 100 females there were 100.8 males. For every 100 females age 18 and over, there were 91.7 males.

The median income for a household in the borough was $29,891, and the median income for a family was $32,727. Males had a median income of $30,208 versus $21,000 for females. The per capita income for the borough was $14,932. About 6.3% of families and 9.5% of the population were below the poverty line, including 11.1% of those under age 18 and 6.7% of those age 65 or over.

4th of July celebration
Osceola Mills is known for its annual Fourth of July Carnival, a week-long celebration sponsored by the Columbia Volunteer Fire Company. The parade and fireworks display on July 4 draws thousands of people from surrounding communities.

Public services
Osceola Mills maintains a recreation park with baseball fields, basketball and tennis courts, and a swimming pool. The borough is also served by five churches, six bars, and a public library. The Osceola Mills Elementary School is part of the Philipsburg-Osceola Area School District. Osceola Mills is now the home of semi-pro football team the Moshannon Valley Vikings. They play at the baseball complex and are a member of the GEFA.

References

Populated places established in 1857
Boroughs in Clearfield County, Pennsylvania
1864 establishments in Pennsylvania